The Archdiocese of Buenos Aires (Archidioecesis Bonaerensis) is a Latin Church ecclesiastical territory or archdiocese of the Catholic Church in Argentina. It is a metropolitan archdiocese with 13 suffragan sees in the country, including two Eastern Catholic eparchies.

The Archbishopric of Buenos Aires is the Primatial see (protocollary first-rank) of Argentina, although the incumbent Metropolitan may be outranked by Cardinals or more senior ones. On 13 March 2013, then-Archbishop Cardinal Jorge Mario Bergoglio was elected as Pope, under the name of Francis. The current archbishop, since 28 March 2013, is Mario Aurelio Poli, appointed by Pope Francis to succeed him as Archbishop of Buenos Aires.

Statistics and extent 
At the beginning of the twentieth century, Buenos Aires was the second largest Catholic city in the world after Paris. In 2014 the Archdiocese pastorally served 2,721,000 Catholics (91.6% of 2,971,000 total) in an area of 205 km2 in 186 parishes and  183 missions with 783 priests (456 diocesan, 327 religious), 11 deacons, 1,915 lay religious (477 brothers, 1,438 sisters) and 53 seminarians. It is divided into the four zonal vicaries—Flores, Devoto, Belgrano and Centro—which are further subdivided into 20 deaconates.

Special churches 
 Its cathedral mother church is the Buenos Aires Metropolitan Cathedral, dedicated to the Holy Trinity, in the autonomous city of Buenos Aires, the national capital of Argentina. 
 It also has the following Minor basilicas, all in the metropolitan Buenos Aires area: Basílica de Nuestra Señora de Buenos Aires, Basílica de Nuestra Señora de la Merced, Buenos Aires, Basílica de Nuestra Señora de la Piedad, Basílica de Nuestra Señora del Pilar, Basílica de Nuestra Señora del Rosario, Basílica de Nuestra Señora del Socorro, Basílica de San Antonio de Padua, Basílica de San Carlos Borromeo y María Auxiliadora, Basílica de San Francisco de Asís, Basílica de San José de Flores, Basílica de San Nicolás de Bari (a National Shrine), Basílica de Santa Rosa de Lima, Basílica del Espíritu Santo, Basílica del Sagrado Corazón de Jesús, Buenos Aires and Basílica del Santísimo Sacramento.

Ecclesiastical province 
The archdiocese has eleven suffragan sees, of which nine are Latin: 
 Roman Catholic Diocese of Avellaneda-Lanús
 Roman Catholic Diocese of Gregorio de Laferrere
 Roman Catholic Diocese of Lomas de Zamora
 Roman Catholic Diocese of Morón
 Roman Catholic Diocese of Quilmes
 Roman Catholic Diocese of San Isidro
 Roman Catholic Diocese of San Justo
 Roman Catholic Diocese of San Martín
 Roman Catholic Diocese of San Miguel

It also has two Eastern Catholic suffragans :
 Maronite Eparchy of San Charbel of Buenos Aires 
 Ukrainian Catholic Eparchy of Santa María del Patrocinio en Buenos Aires.

History 
 It was erected on 6 April 1620 as Diocese of Buenos Aires, on territory split off from the then Roman Catholic Diocese of Paraguay.
 It lost territories on 14 August 1832 to establish the Apostolic Vicariate of Montevideo (now Metropolitan) and again on 13 June 1859 to establish the Diocese of Paraná (now Metropolitan)
 Elevated on 5 March 1866 to Metropolitan Archdiocese of Buenos Aires. 
 Lost territories again in 1884 to establish the Apostolic Vicariate of Northern Patagonia and on February 15, 1897 to establish the then Diocese of La Plata, but gained (back) territories in 1904 from the suppressed above Apostolic Vicariate of Northern Patagonia and on 4 October 1916 from the suppressed Apostolic Prefecture of Southern Patagonia
 On 20 April 1934 it lost territory to establish the Diocese of Viedma
 It received Papal visits from Pope John Paul II in June 1982 and April 1987.

Bishops
(all Roman Rite)

Episcopal ordinaries
Bishops of Buenos Aires
 Pedro Carranza Salinas, O.Carm. (1620–1632)
 Cristóbal de Aresti Martínez de Aguilar, O.S.B. (1635–1641)
 Cristóbal de la Mancha y Velazco, O.P. (1641–1673)
 Antonio de Azcona Imberto (1676–1700)
 Gabriel de Arregui, O.F.M. (1712–1716), appointed Bishop of Cuzco
 Pedro de Fajardo, O.SS.T. (1713–1729)
 Juan de Arregui, O.F.M. (1730–1736)
 José de Peralta Barrionuevo y Rocha Benavídez, O.P. (1738–1746), appointed Bishop of La Paz
 Cayetano Marcellano y Agramont (1749–1757), appointed Bishop of Trujillo and later Archbishop of La Plata
 José Antonio Basurco y Herrera (1757–1761)
 Manuel Antonio de la Torre (1762–1776)
 Sebastián Malvar y Pinto, O.F.M. (1777–1783), appointed Archbishop of Santiago de Compostela
 Manuel Azamor y Ramírez (1785–1796)
 Pedro Inocencio Bejarano (1797–1801), appointed Bishop of Sigüenza
 Benito Lué y Riega (1802–1812) 
 Mariano Medrano y Cabrera (1829–1851)

Archbishops of Buenos Aires
 Mariano José de Escalada Bustillo y Zeballos (1854–1870)
 Federico León Aneiros (1873–1894)
 Uladislao Castellano (1895–1900)
 Mariano Antonio Espinosa (1900–1923)
 José María Bottaro y Hers, O.F.M. (1926–1932)
 Cardinal Santiago Copello (1932–1959), appointed Chancellor of the Holy Roman Church
 Fermín Emilio Lafitte (1959)
 Cardinal Antonio Caggiano (1959–1975)
 Cardinal Juan Carlos Aramburu (1975–1990)
 Cardinal Antonio Quarracino (1990–1998)
 Cardinal Jorge Mario Bergoglio, S.J. (1998–2013), elected Pope Francis
 Cardinal Mario Aurelio Poli (2013–present)

Coadjutor archbishops
Fermín Emilio Lafitte (1958–1959)
Juan Carlos Cardinal Aramburu (1967–1975); future Cardinal
Jorge Mario Bergoglio, S.J. (1997–1998); future Cardinal and Pope Francis

Auxiliary Bishops of Buenos Aires
 Miguel Moises Araoz (1871–1883)
 Juan Agustín Boneo (1893–1898), appointed Bishop of Santa Fe
 Juan Nepomuceno Terrero y Escalada (1898–1900), appointed Bishop of La Plata
 Gregorio Ignazio Romero (1899–1915)
 Francisco Alberti (1917–1921), appointed Bishop of La Plata and later Archbishop of La Plata
 Miguel de Andrea (1919–1960)
 Fortunado Devoto (1927–1941)
Santiago Luis Copello (1928), appointed Archbishop here (Cardinal in 1935)
 Antonio Rocca (1936–1975)
 Tomás Juan Carlos Solari (1943–1948), appointed Archbishop of La Plata
 Manuel Tato (1948–1961), appointed Bishop of Santiago del Estero
 Manuel Menéndez (1956–1961), appointed Bishop of San Martín
 Guillermo Bolatti (1957–1961), appointed Bishop of Rosario and later Archbishop of Rosario
 Victorio Manuel Bonamín, Salesians (S.D.B.) (1960–1975)
 Jorge Carlos Carreras (1962–1965), appointed Bishop of San Rafael and later Bishop of San Justo
 Oscar Félix Villena (1962–1970), appointed Bishop of San Rafael and later Auxiliary Bishop of Rosario
 Ernesto Segura (1962–1972)
 Manuel Augusto Cárdenas (1962–1975)
 Horacio Alberto Bózzoli (1975–1978), appointed Bishop of San Rafael and later Archbishop of Tucumán
 Guillermo Leaden, S.D.B. (1975–1992)
 Mario José Serra (1975–2002)
 José Manuel Lorenzo (1977–1983), appointed Bishop of San Miguel
 Arnaldo Clemente Canale (1977–1990)
 Domingo Salvador Castagna (1978–1984), appointed Bishop of San Nicolás de los Arroyos and later Archbishop of Corrientes 
 Luis Héctor Villalba (1984–1991), appointed Bishop of San Martín and later Archbishop of Tucumán (elevated to Cardinal in 2015)
 Eduardo Mirás (1984–1993), appointed Archbishop of Rosario
 Rubén Oscar Frassia (1992–1993), appointed Bishop of San Carlos de Bariloche and later Bishop of Avellaneda
Jorge Mario Bergoglio, S.J. (1992–1997), appointed Coadjutor here; future Cardinal and Pope Francis
 Héctor Rubén Aguer (1992–1998), appointed Coadjutor Archbishop of La Plata and later Archbishop of La Plata
 Raúl Omar Rossi (1992–2000), appointed Bishop of San Martín
 José Luis Mollaghan (1993–2000), appointed Bishop of San Miguel and later Archbishop of Rosario
 Guillermo Rodríguez Melgarejo (1994–2003), appointed Bishop of San Martín
 Horacio Ernesto Benites Astoul (1999–2008)
 Jorge Eduardo Lozano (2000–2005), appointed Bishop of Gualeguaychú and later Coadjutor Archbishop and Archbishop of San Juan de Cuyo
 Joaquín Mariano Sucunza (2000–present)
 José Antonio Gentico (2001–2007)
 Eduardo Horacio García (2003–2014), appointed Bishop of San Justo
 Raúl Martín (2006–2013)
 Óscar Vicente Ojea (2006–2009), appointed Coadjutor and later Bishop of San Isidro
 Enrique Eguía Seguí (2008–present)
 Luis Alberto Fernández Alara (2009–2013), appointed Bishop of Rafaela
 Vicente Bokalic Iglic, C.M. (2010–2013), appointed Bishop of Santiago del Estero
 Alejandro Daniel Giorgi (2014–present)
 Ernesto Giobando, S.J. (2014–present)
 Juan Carlos Ares (2014–present)
 José María Baliña (2015–present)
 Gustavo Oscar Carrara (2017–present)

Other priests of this diocese who became bishops
Nicolás Fasolino, appointed Bishop of Santa Fe in 1932; future Cardinal
Emilio Antonio di Pasquo, appointed Bishop of San Luis in 1946
Antonio María Aguirre, appointed Bishop of San Isidro in 1957
Alberto Devoto, appointed Bishop of Goya in 1961
Vicente Faustino Zazpe, appointed Bishop of Rafaela in 1961
Carlos Horacio Ponce de Léon, appointed Auxiliary Bishop of Salta in 1962
Luis Juan Tomé, appointed Bishop of Mercedes in 1963
Carmelo Juan Giaquinta, appointed Auxiliary Bishop of Viedma in 1980
Jorge María Mejía, appointed titular Bishop in 1986; future Cardinal
Leonardo Sandri, appointed titular Archbishop in 1997; future Cardinal
Fernando Carlos Maletti, appointed Bishop of San Carlos de Bariloche in 2001
Antonio Marino, appointed Auxiliary Bishop of La Plata in 2003
Eduardo Maria Taussig, appointed Bishop of San Rafael in 2004
César Daniel Fernández, appointed Auxiliary Bishop of Paraná in 2007
Luis Mariano Montemayor, appointed titular Archbishop in 2008
Ariel Edgardo Torrado Mosconi, appointed Auxiliary Bishop of Santiago del Estero in 2008
Alfredo Horacio Zecca, appointed Archbishop of Tucumán in 2011
Fernando Martín Croxatto (priest here, 1986-2000), appointed Auxiliary Bishop of Comodoro Rivadavia in 2014
Han Lim Moon, appointed Auxiliary Bishop of San Martín in 2014
Jorge Martín Torres Carbonell, appointed Auxiliary Bishop of Lomas de Zamora in 2014
Alejandro Pablo Benna, appointed Auxiliary Bishop of Comodoro Rivadavia in 2017
Luis Dario Martín, appointed Auxiliary Bishop of Santa Rosa in 2019
Ignacio Damián Medina, appointed Auxiliary Bishop of Lomas de Zamora in 2019

See also 
 Catholicism in Argentina
 List of Catholic dioceses in Argentina

References

Sources and external links 
 GCatholic, with Google map & satellite photo - data for all sections
  Arzobispado de Buenos Aires — Website of the Archdiocese.
  Catholic-Hierarchy — Statistics on the Archdiocese of Buenos Aires.

Roman Catholic dioceses in Argentina
Roman Catholic Ecclesiastical Province of Buenos Aires
Christianity in Buenos Aires
Religious organizations established in 1620
Roman Catholic dioceses and prelatures established in the 17th century